Marquette Mountain Resort is a small mountain and ski resort in Marquette, Michigan, the major city in the state's Upper Peninsula. The resort offers winter sports seasonally as well as mountain biking, volleyball, and hiking in the spring, summer, and fall.

It has three chairlifts and a rope tow and is equipped with LED lighting for night skiing. The shore of the lake's Marquette Bay is just  to the northeast.  to the south is the extensive runway of the county's Sawyer International Airport. The resort's parking lot is adjacent to highway M-553.

History 
Popular from the start, the ski area opened in late 1957. It was originally known as Cliffs Ridge, as it operated on land leased from the Cleveland-Cliffs Iron Company of Cleveland, Ohio. The first chairlift, a Riblet double, was installed on the skier's right side of Rocket Run in the fall of 1972. Previously, there were 2 T-bars (the original Constam on the skier's left of Rocket and a newer Hall Ski-Lift on the skier's left of Snowfield) and several rope tows. The ski area was renamed "Marquette Mountain" in 1982. In summer of 2020, expansion of the mountain bike trails began.

References

External links 
 
 Map of location at southwest corner of city
 Trail maps from MarquetteMountain.com
 Article on Marquette Mountain, by Freida Waara from SKI Magazine
 Marquette Mountain at Weather.com
 Marquette Mountain Racing Team
 Cleveland-Cliffs, Inc.
 DH Race club - hundreds of photos of the mountain
 Photo – from Milwaukee Sentinel – March 14, 1959

Sports venues in Michigan
Ski areas and resorts in Michigan
Mountains of Michigan
1957 establishments in Michigan
Tourist attractions in Marquette County, Michigan
Buildings and structures in Marquette, Michigan
Landforms of Marquette County, Michigan